Ill or ill may refer to:

 Ill (France), a river in Alsace, France, tributary of the Rhine
 Ill (Vorarlberg), a river in Voralberg, Austria, tributary of the Rhine
 Ill (Saarland), a river of Saarland, Germany, tributary of the Theel
 Illinois (traditionally abbreviated: Ill.), a state in the midwestern region of the United States
 Institut Laue–Langevin, a research centre in Grenoble, France
 Illness, a generally-used synonym for disease
 Koji Nakamura (recording under the name iLL), a Japanese musician
 Tommy Ill, Wellington in New Zealand based rapper
 Interlibrary loan

See also
 III (disambiguation)